The Order of Merit of Mecklenburg-Vorpommern is a civil order of merit, and the highest award of the German State of Mecklenburg-Vorpommern.  The award is presented to men and women for exceptional performance over a long period of time, or an extraordinary individual performance for the benefit of Mecklenburg-Vorpommern.  Founded in 2001 and first presented in 2002, the order may be presented to up to 20 persons per year.

Notable recipients
Reinhart Kny, President of FC Anker Wismar
Horst Klinkmann
Berthold Beitz
Solveig Leo

References

External links
Der Verdienstorden des Landes Mecklenburg-Vorpommern

Mecklenburg-Vorpommern
Mecklenburg-Vorpommern
Culture of Mecklenburg-Western Pomerania